Triptis is a Verwaltungsgemeinschaft ("collective municipality") in the district Saale-Orla-Kreis, in Thuringia, Germany. The seat of the Verwaltungsgemeinschaft is in Triptis.

The Verwaltungsgemeinschaft Triptis consists of the following municipalities:
Dreitzsch 
Geroda 
Lemnitz 
Miesitz 
Mittelpöllnitz 
Rosendorf 
Schmieritz 
Tömmelsdorf 
Triptis

References

Verwaltungsgemeinschaften in Thuringia